Gisèle Préville (1918–2006) was a French film actress and beauty contestant. She entered the film industry after being crowned Miss Paris in 1934 and Miss France in 1935. While she mainly featured in French films, she also starred in the British films Against the Wind (1948) and The Dancing Years (1950).

Partial filmography

 Adventure in Paris (1936) - Solange Surnisse
 Beethoven's Great Love (1936) - (uncredited)
 White Cargo (1937) - Béatrice Blanco
 Trois artilleurs au pensionnat (1937)
 Prison sans barreaux (1938) - Alice
 Trois artilleurs en vadrouille (1938) - Monique Chabert
 Mother Love (1938) - La jeune fille
 Cocoanut (1939) - Nathalie
 Nightclub Hostess (1939) - Lucienne Noblet
 Paris-New York (1940) - Jane Billingham
 Mélodie pour toi (1942) - Irène Daniel
 Two Timid Souls (1943) - Cécile Vancouver
 Vautrin (1943) - Madame de Maufrigneuse
 Trente et quarante (1946) - Aurélia
 Les aventures de Casanova (1947) - Esther Van Hope
 Counter Investigation (1947) - Odette Marchal
 Miroir (1947) - Anna Lussac
 Criminal Brigade (1947) - Christine
 Against the Wind (1948) - Julie
 Return to Life (1949) - Lilian (segment 2 : "Le retour d'Antoine")
 The Dancing Years (1950) - Maria Zeidler
 The Turkey (1951) - Maguy Pacarel
 Les mousquetaires du roi (1951)
 It Happened All Night (1960) - Madame Lenormand
 The President (1961)
 Five Miles to Midnight (1962) - Mrs. Harrington
 A Time for Loving (1972) - Amie Isadore (uncredited)
 The Witness (1978) - Louise Maurisson
 Docteur Jekyll et les femmes (1981) - Dr. Jekyll's mother
 Nuit docile (1987) - L'amie de Simone Dubois (final film role)

References

Bibliography
 Hayward, Susan. Simone Signoret: The Star as Cultural Sign. Continuum, 2004.

External links

1918 births
2006 deaths
French film actresses
French television actresses
Beauty pageant contestants
Actresses from Paris
20th-century French actresses
Models from Paris